Your Box Set Pet (The Complete Recordings 1980–1984) is a three-disc box set compilation album by English new wave band Bow Wow Wow, released on 25 May 2018 by Cherry Red Records.

Disc one of the set consists of their first full-length studio album for RCA Records, See Jungle! See Jungle! Go Join Your Gang Yeah, City All Over! Go Ape Crazy! (1981), in its entirety, plus ten bonus tracks. The cover of the sleeve is the band's take on Édouard Manet’s Le Déjeuner sur l’herbe that was used on the cover of the original album and the EP Last of the Mohicans (1982).

Disc two consists of their second full-length RCA album, When the Going Gets Tough, the Tough Get Going (1983), in its entirety, plus eight bonus tracks.

The third disc, subtitled Singles, B-Sides & Remixes, contains their debut single, "C·30 C·60 C·90 Go" (1980), all eight tracks from the Your Cassette Pet mini-album (1980), and other singles and tracks recorded for EMI Records prior to their move to RCA Records. The cover of the sleeve for this disc is a nude image of lead singer Annabella Lwin painted gold taken by Jim Varriale, previously used for the cover of the 1982 RCA compilation album I Want Candy.

The cover of the actual box set is a play on the cover of Your Cassette Pet, with an old promo photo of Lwin added. It was issued in a clamshell case, and contains liner notes written by Lois Wilson of Mojo. While Your Box Set Pet was billed as the complete recordings of Bow Wow Wow, three tracks (the instrumentals "Bow Wow Wow", "Theme A" and a cover of the Roy Orbison-penned "Cast Iron Arm") that appeared on the 1993 EMI compilation Girl Bites Dog - Your Compact Disc Pet, were not included on this collection. The box set was compiled by Oli Hemingway, and all of the recordings were remastered by Fluid Mastering.

Track listing

References

2018 compilation albums
Bow Wow Wow albums
Cherry Red Records compilation albums